Metro Trains Sydney Pty Ltd (MTS) is the operator of the Sydney Metro. It is a joint venture between Hong Kong-based MTR Corporation, John Holland Group and UGL Rail formed in September 2014. It operates the network with a fleet of 22 Alstom Metropolis trains under a 15-year contract.

The three constituent companies are also partners in the Metro Trains Melbourne joint venture, which has operated the Melbourne suburban network since 2009.

History
In June 2014, Northwest Rapid Transit (NRT), a consortium of Hong Kong-based MTR Corporation, John Holland, CPB Contractors, UGL Rail and Plenary Group, was selected by Transport for NSW to build stations, procure trains and operate services on the Sydney Metro Northwest in a $3.7 billion public–private partnership. The contract was formally awarded by the New South Wales Government in September 2014.

As part of the consortium, MTR Corporation, John Holland and UGL Rail formed the Metro Trains Sydney joint venture in September 2014 to operate metro services when the line opened. The line opened on 26 May 2019, with MTS operating Metro North West Line services on the line.

References

External links
Metro Trains Sydney website
Northwest Rapid Transit consortium website
MTR Sydney Metro North West website

MTR Corporation
Passenger railway companies of Australia
Railway companies of New South Wales
Sydney Metro
Companies based in Sydney
Railway companies established in 2014
Australian companies established in 2014
Public–private partnership projects in Australia
Caisse de dépôt et placement du Québec companies
Multinational joint-venture companies